U.S. Route 250 (US 250) is a United States Numbered Highway that runs from Sandusky, Ohio to Richmond, Virginia. Within the state of Ohio, the route runs from US 6 in Sandusky to the West Virginia border at Bridgeport.

Route description
In Ohio, U.S. 250 is an important cross-state corridor linking Sandusky (on Lake Erie) to Bridgeport (on the Ohio River). From a regional/traffic perspective, the route can roughly be divided into five sections linking major regions and routes of the state:
 US 6 in Sandusky to US 20 at Norwalk
 US 20 at Norwalk to US 30 at Wooster
 US 30 at Wooster to I-77 at Strasburg
 I-77 at New Philadelphia to US 22 at Cadiz
 US 22 at Cadiz to I-70 at Bridgeport

Sandusky to Norwalk
US 250 begins in Sandusky, Ohio at an intersection with US 6 (Cleveland Road). It begins carrying the name Sycamore Line, but US 250 leaves this road shortly for Milan Road. This part of the route carries much traffic connecting to the Ohio Turnpike, and during the summer, people bound for Cedar Point. It is the most heavily developed section of the road, lined with big box stores, a regional shopping mall, an outlet mall, and numerous hotels, indoor waterparks and restaurants.

US 250 crosses SR 2 as it travels south and eventually crosses the Ohio Turnpike on Interstate 80 (I-80) and I-90. It then picks up SR 13 before passing west of Milan. After a short stretch, it enters Norwalk on Milan Avenue. It turns onto League Street and travels southwest to Whittlesey Avenue, which becomes Benedict Avenue as the street travels southeast through the center of the city.

Norwalk to Wooster
Much of this section of the route is rural and two-lane, but it carries a high level of truck and regular traffic. US 250 exits Norwalk and crosses US 20/SR 18 (Norwalk Bypass) at a diamond interchange. The route heads in a generally southeasterly direction until Fitchville, where it enters on Wooster Street. SR 13 finally separates from US 250 before the latter turns onto Mill Street Extension, turning south off said road shortly after.

US 250 continues southeast until it meets SR 60, and the two routes enter Savannah on North Main Street and pass straight through town. They continue together toward Ashland, where it meets an intersection with Cottage Street. SR 60 continues south on Cottage Street, while US 250 turns east, meeting US 42 east of the city and forming an overlap as it turns south. Upon meeting Main Street, US 250 leaves US 42 at an intersection and turns east. It passes through sparse development outside the city until it interchanges with I-71.

US 250 continues east on Ashland Road in open countryside, passing through small communities.  West of Wooster, US 250 enters US 30, carrying the name Lincoln Way, and bypasses the city to the south, exiting at a partial cloverleaf interchange which sends it south on SR 83. US 250 then turns east on Dover Road south of the city.

Wooster to Strasburg
On Dover Road, US 250 follows a two-lane alignment as it passes through mostly open fields on its path to Strasburg. The route forms the main streets of several communities as it passes through them, such as Apple Creek, Mount Eaton, and Wilmot. It intersects SR 21 just before entering town, which it does on Wooster Avenue. This densely populated stretch of US 250 in Strasburg has been proposed for a bypass, but the project has not been selected for further work as of 2008.

After passing through Strasburg, US 250 enters I-77. The two routes then travel south concurrent with one another.

New Philadelphia to Cadiz
I-77 and US 250 travel in a southern direction until reaching New Philadelphia. The two highways form a bypass of the city, with the concurrency forming the west side and US 250 along forming the south side, as I-77 separates from US 250 in the southwest corner of the city.  SR 800 joins the freeway at Broadway outside of New Philadelphia as it follows the Dennison/Uhrichsville freeway bypass of US 250. The two routes follow a four-lane, divided highway toward Uhrichsville, where US 250/SR 800 turns west at an interchange with US 36. At the end of the dual highway, SR 800 turns south toward Dennison, and US 250 turns north, following a two-lane, curvy alignment en route to Cadiz.

Approximately halfway between Dennison and Cadiz, US 250 follows Tappan Lake for several miles on a series of causeways built during the construction of the lake by the Muskingum Watershed Conservancy District in the 1930s. This route is generally of good quality (albeit without shoulders), although ODOT is studying replacement or upgrade through its Macro-Corridors Project. Near Cadiz, it merges onto the Cadiz Bypass, where it runs concurrent with US 22. It then turns onto Lincoln Avenue and passes through the city of Cadiz. US 250 then turns onto Market Street and follows it south out of town.

Cadiz to Bridgeport
From Cadiz, US 250's name changes to Cadiz–Harrisville Road, heading south-southeast. Shortly after exiting the city, US 250 begins to curve and wind sharply, with several hairpin turns. For much of this distance, the road is surrounded by dense residential areas and runs on ridge tops. After it passes through Harrisville, the road becomes less curvy but is fronted densely with homes for almost the remainder of its route within the state, save the forest at its south end, where it features another hairpin curve. It continues southeast to Bridgeport, where it features a partial interchange with SR 7. US 250 then joins US 40 and crosses the Ohio River into West Virginia.

The poor alignment of this section of the highway, along with the fact that it runs through Cadiz as opposed to bypassing it, limits the usefulness of this section of the road as a through route. To resolve these issues, the Ohio Department of Transportation is developing plans to construct a Super 2 replacement for this route. A bypass of Cadiz was planned for construction in 2004, although it has not been built as of 2017. The new route is to roughly parallel SR 9 and SR 331, running from Cadiz to a point near Saint Clairsville. At this point, it is expected that US 250 will be realigned to follow I-70 east to Wheeling, West Virginia.

Major intersections

References

External links

50-2
 Ohio
Transportation in Erie County, Ohio
Transportation in Huron County, Ohio
Transportation in Ashland County, Ohio
Transportation in Wayne County, Ohio
Transportation in Stark County, Ohio
Transportation in Tuscarawas County, Ohio
Transportation in Harrison County, Ohio
Transportation in Belmont County, Ohio